Benja may refer to:
Šimun Kožičić Benja (1460–1536), Croatian nobleman
Benja Razafimahaleo (born 1957), Malagasy politician
Benja Bruijning (born 1983), Dutch actor
Benja (footballer) (born 1987), Spanish footballer